Hohenfelden is a municipality in the Weimarer Land district of Thuringia, Germany.

History
Within the German Empire (1871–1918), the northern part of Hohenfelden belonged to the Grand Duchy of Saxe-Weimar-Eisenach, while the southern part belonged to the Duchy of Saxe-Meiningen.

References

Weimarer Land
Grand Duchy of Saxe-Weimar-Eisenach
Duchy of Saxe-Meiningen